Bur Oak Secondary School (BOSS) is a public secondary school in Markham, Ontario, Canada established in 2007, and is part of the York Region District School Board. The school was named after the road which it is built on, which in turn is named for the city of Markham's official tree, the Bur oak.  As of 2018, the school has a student population of approximately 1600.

History
Bur Oak Secondary School opened in September 2007 with only two grades (9 & 10). Bur Oak held its 'official' opening ceremony on  May 1, 2008 followed by an open house.  The school now boasts a student population of upwards of 1,500 students in all four grades. The school's official colours consist of royal blue, gold, white, and black.

Academics
Bur Oak Secondary School is noted for its strong academic performance. According to the 2015 ranking of Ontario secondary schools, Bur Oak ranks 10th out of 676 schools in the province.

The school offers a unique four-year core French program with intensive focus is placed on global French culture, music and history, in addition to grammar and structure.

The school also offers a Specialist High Skills Major (SHSM) program. As of the 2015-2016 school year, the program is offered in five specializations:

Arts & Culture
Business
Energy
Health & Wellness
Non-Profit

The program provides students with valuable skills and certifications related to their specialization and career path, and is completed in the final two years of high school.

Awards ceremony
At its annual awards ceremony in September, the school recognizes the academic achievement of students with the following awards:
 Honour Roll: These recipients have earned an overall average of at least 80%.
 Subject Award: These recipients have shown initiative in a specific course. However, unlike the vast majority of schools that give the award to the student earning the highest mark and the strongest performance, BOSS requires a mark of at least 75%.
 Principal's Award: This award is given to the three students earning the highest academic average in each grade.

As of the 2011-12 school year, only subject awards are given each semester; the Honour Roll and Principal's Award recipients are currently determined based on their marks from throughout the whole school year instead of the previously established semester marking.

Extracurricular activities
Bur Oak Secondary School boasts a variety of student-led organizations and clubs and holds several student events throughout the year.  Notably, it holds an annual back-to-school barbeque, Bossilicious in September, and a Summer Carnival in late May.  In addition, the school also hosts dances, movie nights, and coffeehouses that are organized by Student Activity Council, satellite councils, academic departments, or student clubs.

Student Activity Council

Many student events are coordinated by Student Activity Council (SAC). Student Activity Council is an umbrella organization that derives its membership from the Co-Directors of the seven satellite councils:

Student Events Council
Athletic Council
Business Council
Equity Council
Music Council 
Community Council
Global Action Council
International Student Association

Student Activity Council is led by two Co-Presidents that are elected popularly by students in the preceding school year.

Satellite councils are led by two Co-Directors and an Executive team selected at the end of the preceding school year. Each of the satellite councils different interests within the school, some, like Music and Business Councils, organize extracurricular activities related to specific academic departments, while others, such as Community and Global Action are more focused on student engagement in community service and social justice.

Transportation

School bus
As per the criteria of Student Transportation Service (joint school bus service for YRDSB and YCDSB), students from grade 9-12 in the YRDSB are eligible for school bus transportation if they are:
 Living more than 3.2 km from the school (measured along safe walkways); and
 Living in a non-transit served area. (A transit served area means that a person can get to and from school using the YRT/Viva in less than an hour, needs to walk no more than 1 km to/from the stop, and needs to take a maximum of 3 buses each way).

Students in a special needs program (excluding gifted), are exempt from the policy and receive it based on a separate criteria.

Public transit

The YRT routes which stop at or near the school are:
 18 - Bur Oak. Westbound to Angus Glen Community Centre and Library. Eastbound to Markham-Stouffville Hospital
 402 - Bur Oak/Pierre Elliot Trudeau High School Special. Westbound to Angus Glen Community Centre and Library. Eastbound to Markham-Stouffville Hospital. Operates only during the morning and afternoon on school days. 
 45 - Mingay. Northbound to Major Mackenzie Drive East. Southbound to Markville Mall.
 102D - Markham Road (Operated by the TTC). Northbound to Major Mackenzie Drive East then Southbound to Warden Station (Subway), an extra TTC fare is required when travelling south of Steeles.
 129A - McCowan North (Operated by the TTC). Northbound to Major Mackenzie Drive East. Southbound to Scarborough Centre Station (Mall connecting to LRT), an extra TTC fare is required when travelling south of Steeles.

YRT fares are $4.25 in cash for a two-hour pass, student tickets are $3.03 and are purchased through PRESTO or the YRT pay app, and a student monthly pass is $118.00.

Film
In May 2016, the location was using in the filming of a scene in the 2017 movie Downsizing.

See also
List of high schools in Ontario

References

Educational institutions established in 2007
High schools in the Regional Municipality of York
York Region District School Board
Education in Markham, Ontario
2007 establishments in Ontario